Eddie Dean (born Edgar Dean Glosup;  – ) was an American Western singer and actor whom Roy Rogers and Gene Autry termed the best cowboy singer of all time. Dean was best known for "I Dreamed of a Hill-Billy Heaven" (1955), which became an even greater hit for Tex Ritter in 1961. Dean charted twice on the US Country charts; "One Has My Name (The Other Has My Heart)" peaked at number 11 in 1948 and "I Dreamed of a Hill-Billy Heaven" peaked at number 10 in 1955. Dean co-wrote both songs. Dean charted again with the song "Way Out Yonder" in 1955.

References

External links

American male singer-songwriters
Singer-songwriters from Texas
American country singer-songwriters
American male film actors
Singing cowboys
American male television actors
Male actors from Texas
People from Greater Los Angeles
People from Hopkins County, Texas
Deaths from emphysema
1907 births
1999 deaths
20th-century American male actors
20th-century American singers
People from Westlake Village, California
Burials at Valley Oaks Memorial Park
Country musicians from Texas
20th-century American male singers
Male Western (genre) film actors
Singer-songwriters from California